Estancia Grande may refer to:

 Estancia Grande, Entre Ríos, a village and municipality
 , a village and municipality in Coronel Pringles Department, San Luis